'The Austrian Film Commission (AFC), founded in 1987, is an organisation dedicated to promoting Austrian cinema throughout the world.

Activities
The AFC's role is to increase awareness of Austrian film making abroad and to support the positioning and release of Austrian films on the international marketplace.

Acting both as an information clearing house and as a facilitating agency for export purposes, the AFC maintains ongoing contacts with festival directors, sales agents, buyers and distributors, as well as the press, concerning new Austrian productions. Offering a wide variety of services at the domestic and international level, the AFC consults with producers and creative artists attending international festivals and markets and supports their activities.

The AFC represents Austria in the network of European film organisations for the worldwide advertisement of European film, the European Film Promotion.

The AFC represents the Austrian film industry at all important festivals and markets, principally the Cannes Film Festival, Berlin International Film Festival, Venice Film Festival, Toronto International Film Festival, San Sebastián International Film Festival, International Film Festival Rotterdam, Locarno International Film Festival, Karlovy Vary International Film Festival, Pusan International Film Festival, Buenos Aires International Festival of Independent Cinema and the American Film Market in Los Angeles.

The AFC produces a number of publications:
Austrian Films: The annual catalogue Austrian Films lists the current year's productions in various categories (features, documentaries, co-productions, and a selection of students’ shorts and of TV features).
Austrian Film Guide: a brochure containing the most important data and addresses relating to the Austrian film industry;
Austrian Film News: The Austrian Film News magazine provides information about filmmakers and the film industry in Austria; published twice a year. Its contents include interviews with and portraits of filmmakers; articles on current shootings and relevant topics; information about subsidies, festival showings and the most important festival dates. The production telegram provides news about films in production and the theatre releases..

The AFC website provides news on current Austrian filmmaking and interviews, a film database, addresses and data on the Austrian film industry and a comprehensive list of the festival participations of Austrian films since 2006.

The first Diagonale film festivals in Salzburg (1993 to 1995) were organised by the Austrian Film Commission.

Martin Schweighofer has been the director of the Austrian Film Commission since 1992.

See also
 Location Austria – agency for promoting Austria as an international film location

Notes

Sources and external links
 Austrian Film Commission official website 
 European Film Promotion

Film commissions
Film organisations in Austria
1987 establishments in Austria
Organizations established in 1987